Ayan may refer to:

Places
Ayan, Iran, a village in West Azerbaijan Province, Iran
Ayan, Russia, a rural locality (a selo) and a port in Khabarovsk Krai on the Sea of Okhotsk, Russia
Ayan, Çankırı, a village in Turkey
Ayan Virusampatti, village in Tamil Nadu, India
Auyán-tepui, spelled as Ayan a mountain in Bolívar state, Venezuela.
Ayan-Yuryakh a river in the Magadan Oblast in Russia.

Other uses
Ayan (given name), a list of people with the name
Ayan (film), a 2009 Indian Tamil film starring Suriya
Ayan (class), the powerful local notables in the Ottoman Empire before the 1920s
Derebey, also known as âyân, feudal lord in 18th century Anatolia

See also

Ajan (disambiguation)